Marcin Szlachciński (Latin: Martinus Slachcinius; born: 1511–1512) was a Polish renaissance scholar; Polish, Latin and Ancient Greek translator; poet; philosopher and professor at the Jagiellonian University.

Personal life
Szlachciński was born in the village of Szlachcin in the Greater Poland as part of the Polish Szlachta, and used the Nowina coat of arms. He studied at the Jagiellonian University (also known as the Cracow Academy). He  married a noble-born woman, Zofia Zberkowska of the Wczele coat of arms.

Selected works
In Felicem Cracoviam Ingressvm Serenissimi Principis Ac Domini, Domini Sigismundi eius nominis Tertij, Dei gratia electi Poloniae, et Succiae designati regis, Magni ducis Lithuaniae, Russiae, Prussiae, Masouiae, etc. etc. Carmen gratulatorium, print. 1587;
In Insignia Reuerendi et Excellentissimi viri Domini Thomae Rhacusani epigrammata, print 1586.

See also
 Jagiellonian University
 Nowina coat of arms

References

1510s births
Year of death unknown